Dokhunda is a 1934 Soviet drama film directed by Lev Kuleshov.

Plot 
The film tells about the powerless laborer Edgor, who is popularly called "Dokhunda", who starts a new life in Tajikistan. The film is based on the novel with the same title by Tajik  national poet Sadriddin Ayni, but the project was regarded with suspicion by the authorities as possibly exciting Tajik nationalism, and stopped. No footage survives. In 1956, director Boris (Besion) Kimyagarov (1920–1979) was finally able to get approval for a movie version of Dokhunda.

Starring 
 Kamil Yarmatov as Edgor
 T. Rakhmanova as Giulnor
 Semyon Svashenko as Sabir
 Sergey Komarov as Azim-Shakh
 R. Petrov as Big Chief Oaqsaqual

References

External links 

1934 films
1930s Russian-language films
Soviet black-and-white films
Soviet drama films
1934 drama films